Susannah Clare Goshko  is a British civil servant in His Majesty's Diplomatic Service. She is the British High Commissioner to Canada, replacing Susan le Jeune d'Allegeershecque on September 7, 2021.

Career 
Goshko was deputy director at the Department for Exiting the European Union. She was the Principal Private Secretary to the Secretary of State for Foreign and Commonwealth Affairs from April 2019 to 2021.

Goshko was appointed Companion of the Order of St Michael and St George (CMG) in the 2021 Birthday Honours for services to British foreign policy.

In October 2021, she gave her first interview in Canada on Power & Politics on CBC News.

Personal life
Goshko's husband, Matt, has served as director of press at the Embassy of the United States, London.

References

External links 
 Susannah Goshko at Twitter

Living people
British women ambassadors
High Commissioners of the United Kingdom to Canada
People from London
Members of HM Diplomatic Service
Year of birth missing (living people)
Companions of the Order of St Michael and St George
Private secretaries in the British Civil Service
21st-century British diplomats